Gregor Cankar (born 25 January 1975 in Celje) is a Slovenian track and field athlete competing in long jump who won the bronze medal at the 1999 World Championships in Athletics. He finished sixth at the 1996 Summer Olympics.

His personal best jump is Slovene record, 8.40 metres, achieved in 1997 in his hometown Celje.

Achievements

References

1975 births
Living people
Slovenian male long jumpers
Athletes (track and field) at the 1996 Summer Olympics
Athletes (track and field) at the 2000 Summer Olympics
Athletes (track and field) at the 2004 Summer Olympics
Olympic athletes of Slovenia
World Athletics Championships medalists
Sportspeople from Celje
World Athletics Championships athletes for Slovenia
Universiade medalists in athletics (track and field)
Mediterranean Games gold medalists for Slovenia
Mediterranean Games medalists in athletics
Athletes (track and field) at the 1997 Mediterranean Games
Athletes (track and field) at the 2001 Mediterranean Games
Universiade bronze medalists for Slovenia
Medalists at the 1995 Summer Universiade
Medalists at the 1997 Summer Universiade